Llangoed Football Club is a Welsh football team based in Llangoed, Anglesey, Wales.  The team currently play in the North Wales Coast West Football League Division One, which is at the fifth tier of the Welsh football league system. Previously known as Llangoed & District, the club are two-times champions of the Anglesey League and have also seen success across a range of cup competitions in North Wales.

History
The club previously played in the Anglesey League before moving up to the Gwynedd League. In 2020 the team was accepted into the Division One of the new North Wales Coast West Football League.

Honours
Club honours include the following:

League
Anglesey League Division One
Champions (2): 1972–73, 1988–89
Anglesey League Division Two
Champions: 1987–88
Anglesey League Division Three 
Champions: 1980–81

Cups
Bwlch Car Boot Trophy
Winners (1): 2016–17
Dargie Cup
Winners (5): 1969–70, 1970–71, 1984–85, 1988–89, 2016–17
Elias Cup
Winners (2):
J W Lees Shield
Winners (1): 1980–81
Lucas Oil Cup
Winners (1): 2015–16
Megan Cup
Winners (4): 1963–64, 1971–72, 1972–73, 1999–2000
Thomas and Williams Cup
Winners (1): 2003–04
North Wales Amateur Cup
Winners (1): 1970–71
North Wales Coast FA Junior Challenge Cup
Winners (2): 1970–71, 2003–04

External links
Club official website
Club official Facebook

References

Football clubs in Wales
North Wales Coast Football League clubs
Anglesey League clubs
Gwynedd League clubs
Sport in Anglesey